Zavodoukovsky Urban Okrug is a municipal formation (an urban okrug) in Tyumen Oblast, Russia, one of the five urban okrugs in the oblast. Its territory comprises the territories of two administrative divisions of Tyumen Oblast—Zavodoukovsky District and the Town of Zavodoukovsk.

The urban okrug was established by the Law of Tyumen Oblast #263 of November 5, 2004.

Zavodoukovsky District

Zavodoukovsky District  is an administrative district (raion), one of the twenty-two in Tyumen Oblast, Russia. As a municipal division, it is a part of Zavodoukovsky Urban Okrug. It is located in the southwest of the oblast. Its administrative center is the town of Zavodoukovsk (which is not administratively a part of the district). Population: 21,101 (2010 Census);

References

Notes

Sources

Urban okrugs of Russia

